The electoral district of Campbell Town was a single-member electoral district of the Tasmanian House of Assembly. It centred on the towns of Campbell Town and Ross in the Midlands region of Tasmania between Hobart and Launceston.

The seat was created ahead of the Assembly's first election held in 1856, and was abolished at the 1903 election, when it was merged with neighbouring Oatlands and the northern part of Glamorgan into the new district of Cambria.

Members for Campbell Town

References
 
 
 Parliament of Tasmania (2006). The Parliament of Tasmania from 1956

Campbell Town